Carlos Arce (born 4 February 1985, in Lanús) is an Argentine football defender. He currently plays for Club Atlético Lanús in Argentina.

External links
 Argentine Primera statistics

1985 births
Living people
Sportspeople from Lanús
Argentine people of Basque descent
Argentine footballers
Association football defenders
Argentine Primera División players
Club Atlético Lanús footballers